Menini is a surname. Notable people with the surname include:

Alexandre Menini (born 1983), French rugby union player
Joaquín Menini (born 1991), Argentine field hockey player
Rubén Menini (1924–2020), Argentine basketball player

See also
Menino